The Guinea women's national handball team is the national team of Guinea. It is governed by the Guinean Handball Federation and takes part in international handball competitions.

African Championship record
2014 – 8th
2016 – 7th
2018 – 7th
2021 – 7th
2022 – 9th

External links
IHF profile

Women's national handball teams
Handball
National team